First Presbyterian Church of Mumford is a historic Presbyterian church located at Mumford in Monroe County, New York. It was designed by architect Andrew Jackson Warner and is a High Victorian Gothic–style edifice built in 1883 of rare bog limestone (tufa).  The main block of the building is five bays long and  three bays wide (approximately 50 feet by 60 feet), with a freestanding 70-foot tower with spire at the northwest corner.

It was listed on the National Register of Historic Places in 2002.

References

Churches on the National Register of Historic Places in New York (state)
Presbyterian churches in New York (state)
Gothic Revival church buildings in New York (state)
Churches completed in 1883
19th-century Presbyterian church buildings in the United States
Churches in Monroe County, New York
National Register of Historic Places in Monroe County, New York